Favartia (Favartia) vittata is a species of sea snail, a marine gastropod mollusk in the family Muricidae, the murex snails or rock snails.

Description
The shell size varies between 15 mm and 35 mm.

Distribution
This species is distributed in the Gulf of California, (W Mexico) and in the Pacific Ocean along Peru and Galápagos.

References

External links
 

Gastropods described in 1833
Favartia